Alfonso XIII (Spanish: Alfonso León Fernando María Jaime Isidro Pascual Antonio de Borbón y Habsburgo-Lorena; French: Alphonse Léon Ferdinand Marie Jacques Isidore Pascal Antoine de Bourbon; 17 May 1886 – 28 February 1941), also known as El Africano or the African due to his Africanist views, was King of Spain from 17 May 1886 to 14 April 1931, when the Second Spanish Republic was proclaimed. He was a monarch from birth as his father, Alfonso XII, had died the previous year. Alfonso's mother, Maria Christina of Austria, served as regent until he assumed full powers on his sixteenth birthday in 1902.

Alfonso XIII's upbringing and public image were closely linked to the military estate, often presenting himself as a soldier-king. His effective reign started four years after the so-called 1898 Disaster, with various social factions projecting their expectations of national regeneration upon him. Similarly to other European monarchs of his time, he played an important political role, entailing a highly controversial use of his constitutional executive powers. His wedding with Victoria Eugenie of Battenberg in 1906 was marked by a regicide attempt, from which he escaped unharmed.

With a divided opinion of the public eye on World War I, and moreover a split between the pro-German and pro-Entente sympathizers, Alfonso XIII leveraged his family relations to every major European royal family to help preserve the stance of neutrality espoused by the government. Several factors led to undermine the monarch's constitutional legitimacy: the rupture of the  system, the further deepening of the Restoration system crisis in the 1910s, a trio of crises in 1917, the spiral of violence in Morocco, and the lead up to the installment of the dictatorship of Miguel Primo de Rivera through a 1923 military coup d'etat that won the acquiescence from Alfonso XIII.

Upon the political failure of the dictatorship, Alfonso XIII removed support from Primo de Rivera (who was thereby forced to resign in 1930) and favoured (during the so-called dictablanda) a return to the pre-1923 state of affairs. Nevertheless, he had lost most of his political capital along the way. He left Spain voluntarily after the municipal elections of April 1931 – which was understood as a plebiscite on maintaining the monarchy or declaring a republic – the result of which led to the proclamation of the Second Spanish Republic on 14 April 1931.

His efforts with the European War Office during World War I earned him a nomination on the Nobel Peace Prize in 1917, which was ultimately won by the Red Cross. To date, he remains the only monarch to have been nominated for a Nobel Prize.

Reign

Early life and education

Alfonso XIII was born at Royal Palace of Madrid on 17 May 1886. He was the posthumous son of Alfonso XII of Spain, who had died in November 1885, and became King upon his birth. Just after he was born, he was carried naked to the prime minister Práxedes Mateo Sagasta on a silver tray.

Five days later he was carried in a solemn court procession with a Golden Fleece round his neck and was baptised with water specially brought from the River Jordan in Palestine. The French newspaper Le Figaro described the young king in 1889 as "the happiest and best-loved of all the rulers of the earth". His mother, Maria Christina of Austria, served as his regent until his sixteenth birthday. During the regency, in 1898, Spain lost its colonial rule over Cuba, Puerto Rico, Guam and the Philippines to the United States as a result of the Spanish–American War.

Alfonso became seriously ill during the 1889–1890 pandemic. His health deteriorated around 10 January 1890 and doctors reported his condition as the flu attacked his nervous system leaving the young king in a state of indolence. He eventually recovered.

When Alfonso came of age in May 1902, the week of his majority was marked by festivities, bullfights, balls and receptions throughout Spain. He took his oath to the constitution before members of the Cortes on 17 May.

Alfonso received, to a large extent, a military education that imbued him with "a Spanish nationalism strengthened by his military vocation". Besides the clique of military tutors, Alfonso also received political teachings from a liberal——and moral precepts from an integrist, José Fernández de la Montaña.

Engagement and marriage

By 1905, Alfonso was looking for a suitable consort. On a state visit to the United Kingdom, he stayed in London at Buckingham Palace with King Edward VII. There he met Princess Victoria Eugenie of Battenberg, the daughter of Edward's youngest sister Princess Beatrice, and a granddaughter of Queen Victoria. He found her attractive, and she returned his interest. There were obstacles to the marriage. Victoria was a Protestant, and would have to become a Catholic. Victoria's brother Leopold was a haemophiliac, so there was a 50 percent chance that Victoria was a carrier of the trait. Finally, Alfonso's mother Maria Christina wanted him to marry a member of her family, the House of Habsburg-Lorraine, or some other Catholic princess, as she considered the Battenbergs to be non-dynastic.

Victoria was willing to change her religion, and her being a haemophilia carrier was only a possibility. Maria Christina was eventually persuaded to drop her opposition. In January 1906 she wrote an official letter to Princess Beatrice proposing the match. Victoria met Maria Christina and Alfonso in Biarritz, France, later that month, and converted to Catholicism in San Sebastián in March.

In May, diplomats of both kingdoms officially executed the agreement of marriage. Alfonso and Victoria were married at the Royal Monastery of San Jerónimo in Madrid on 31 May 1906, with British royalty in attendance, including Victoria's cousins the Prince and Princess of Wales (later King George V and Queen Mary). The wedding was marked by an assassination attempt on Alfonso and Victoria by Catalan anarchist Mateu Morral. As the wedding procession returned to the palace, he threw a bomb from a window which killed 30 bystanders and members of the procession, while 100 others were wounded.

On 10 May 1907, the couple's first child, Alfonso, Prince of Asturias, was born. Victoria was in fact a haemophilia carrier, and Alfonso inherited the condition.

Neither of the two daughters born to the King and Queen were haemophilia carriers, but another of their sons, Gonzalo (1914–1934), had the condition. Alfonso distanced himself from his wife for transmitting the condition to their sons. From 1914 on, he had several mistresses, and fathered five illegitimate children. A sixth illegitimate child had been born before his marriage.

World War I

During World War I, because of his family connections with both sides and the division of popular opinion, Spain remained neutral. The King established an office for assistance to prisoners of war on all sides. This office used the Spanish diplomatic and military network abroad to intercede for thousands of POWs – transmitting and receiving letters for them, and other services. The office was located in the Royal Palace.

Alfonso attempted to save the Russian Tsar Nicholas II and his family from the Bolsheviks who captured them, sending two telegrams offering the Russian royal family refuge in Spain. He later learned of the execution of the Romanov family, but was mistaken in believing that only Nicholas II and his son Alexi had been killed. As such, he continued to push for the Tsaress Alexandra and her four daughters to be brought to Spain, not having realized that they had also been murdered.

Alfonso became gravely ill during the 1918 flu pandemic. Spain was neutral and thus under no wartime censorship restrictions, so his illness and subsequent recovery were reported to the world, while flu outbreaks in the belligerent countries were concealed. This gave the misleading impression that Spain was the most affected area and led to the pandemic being dubbed "the Spanish Flu".

Cracking of the system and dictatorship

Following World War I, Spain entered the lengthy yet victorious Rif War (1920–1926) to preserve its colonial rule over northern Morocco. Critics of the monarchy thought the war was an unforgivable loss of money and lives, and nicknamed Alfonso el Africano ("the African"). Alfonso had not acted as a strict constitutional monarch, and supported the Africanists who wanted to conquer for Spain a new empire in Africa to compensate for the lost empire in the Americas and elsewhere. The Rif War had starkly polarized Spanish society between the Africanists who wanted to conquer an empire in Africa vs. the abandonistas who wanted to abandon Morocco as not worth the blood and treasure. Alfonso liked to play favourites with his generals, and one of his most favoured generals was Manuel Fernández Silvestre. In 1921, when Silvestre advanced up into the Rif mountains of Morocco, Alfonso sent him a telegram whose first line read "Hurrah for real men!", urging Silvestre not to retreat at a time when Silvestre was experiencing major difficulties. Silvestre stayed the course, leading his men into the Battle of Annual, one of Spain's worst defeats. Alfonso, who was on holiday in the south of France at the time, was informed of the "Disaster of the Annual" while he was playing golf. Reportedly, Alfonso's response to the news was to shrug his shoulders and say "Chicken meat is cheap", before resuming his game. Alfonso remained in France and did not return to Spain to comfort the families of the soldiers lost in the battle, which many people at the time saw as a callous and cold act, a sign that the King was indifferent over the lives of his soldiers. In 1922, the Cortes started an investigation into the responsibility for the Annual disaster and soon discovered evidence that the King had been one of the main supporters of Silvestre's advance into the Rif mountains.

After the "Disaster of the Annual", Spain's war in the Rif went from bad to worse, and as the Spanish were barely hanging on to Morocco, support for the abandonistas grew as many people could see no point to the war. In August 1923, Spanish soldiers embarking for Morocco mutinied, other soldiers in Málaga simply refused to board the ships that were to take them to Morocco, while in Barcelona huge crowds of left-wingers had staged anti-war protests at which Spanish flags were burned while the flag of the Rif Republic was waved about. With the Africanists comprising only a minority, it was clear that it was only a matter of time before the abandonistas forced the Spanish to give up on the Rif, which was part of the reason for the military coup d'état later in 1923.

On 13 September 1923, Miguel Primo de Rivera, Captain General of Catalonia, staged a military coup with the collaboration from a quad of Africanist generals based in Madrid who were associated to the innermost military clique of Alfonso XIII and who wanted to prevent investigations about Annual from tarnishing the monarch (José Cavalcanti, Federico Berenguer, Leopoldo Saro and Antonio Dabán), even if Primo de Rivera had embraced Abandonista positions prior to that point. Primo de Rivera ruled as a dictator with the king's support until January 1930.

On 28 January 1930, amid economic problems, general unpopularity and a putschist plot led by General Manuel Goded in motion, of which Alfonso XIII was most probably aware, Miguel Primo de Rivera was forced to resign, exiling to Paris, only to die a few weeks later of the complications from diabetes in combination with the effects of a flu. Alfonso XIII appointed General Dámaso Berenguer as the new prime minister. Back in 1926, Alfonso XIII had appointed Berenguer as Chief of Staff of the Military House of the King, a post conventionally fit for burned-out generals in order to move them away from the spotlight for a time in a show of affection. The new  period was nicknamed as dictablanda. The King was so closely associated with the dictatorship of Primo de Rivera that it was difficult for him to distance himself from the regime that he had supported for almost seven years. The enforced changes relied on the incorrect assumption that Spaniards would accept the notion that nothing had happened after 1923 and that going back to the prior state of things was possible.

Dethronement and politics in exile

On 12 April, the Republican coalition, short of winning a majority of councillors overall, won a sweeping majority in major cities in the 1931 municipal elections, which were perceived as a plebiscite on monarchy. The results shocked the government, with foreign minister Romanones admitting to the press an "absolute monarchist defeat" and Civil Guard honcho José Sanjurjo reportedly telling government ministers that, given circumstances, the Armed Forces could not be "absolutely" relied upon for the sustainment of the monarchy. Alfonso XIII fled the country and the Second Spanish Republic was peacefully proclaimed on 14 April 1931.

In November 1931, the Constituent Republican Cortes held an impassionate debate about the political responsibilities of the former monarch. Some of the grievances against the action of Alfonso XIII as a king included interference in the institutions to reinforce his personal power, bargaining personal support from the military clique with rewards and merits, his abuse of the power to dissolve the legislature, rendering the co-sovereingty between the Nation and the Crown a total fiction; that he had disproportionately fostered the Armed forces (often to contain internal protest), had used the armed forces abroad with imperialist aims alien to the interests of the nation but his own, that he had personally devised the military operation of Annual behind the back of the Council of Ministers, and that following the massacre of Annual that "cost the lives of thousands of Spanish lads", he had decided to launch a coup with the help of a few generals rather than facing scrutiny in the legislature. Other than Romanones, who exculpated the actions of the monarch, disconformity towards the Primo de Rivera dictatorship notwithstanding, no other legislator intervened in his favour, with the debate focusing on whether labelling the monarch's actions as a military rebellion, lèse-majesté, high treason, or even condemning "a delinquent personality" or "a wholly punishable life". The debate ended with an eloquent speech by Prime Minister Manuel Azaña pleading for the unanimity of the house "to condemn and exclude D. Alfonso de Borbón from the law, proclaiming the majesty of our republic, the unbreakable will of our civism and the permanence of the Spanish glories framed by the institutions freely given by the Nation". The house passed the act brought forward by the Commission of Responsibilities, summarizing Alfonso de Borbón's responsibilities as being guilty of high treason.

Involved in anti-Republican plots from his exile, and keen to draw support from the Carlists in the context of the uneasy and competing relations between the Carlist and Alfonsist factions within the radicalised monarchist camp, in the aftermath of so-called Pact of Territet he issued a statement dated 23 January 1932 endorsing the manifesto launched by Carlist claimant Alfonso Carlos (in which the latter hinted at the cession of dynastic rights should the former king accept "those fundamental principles which in our traditional regime have been demanded of all Kings with precedence of personal rights"), with the dethroned king likewise accusing in the document the reformist Republic to be "inspired and sponsored by communism, freemasonry and judaism".

In 1933, his two eldest sons, Alfonso and Jaime, renounced their claims to the defunct throne on the same day, and in 1934 his youngest son Gonzalo died. This left his third son Juan his only male heir.

After the July 1936 attempted coup d'état against the democratically elected Republican government a war broke out in Spain. On 30 July 1936, Alfonso's son Juan took the initiative of leaving Cannes to go to Spain to join the rebel faction, with the former king (then in a hunting trip in Czechoslovakia) reportedly giving consent, so Juan de Borbón crossed the border set to join the front in Somosierra dressed in a blue jumpsuit and red beret under the fake name "Juan López". However, rebel general Emilio Mola, mastermind behind the putschist plot, was warned of the move and had Juan returned. The former king made it clear he favoured the rebel faction against the Republican government. In September 1936, the general who had emerged as leader of the rebel faction, Francisco Franco, declared that he would not restore Alfonso as king.

Death

On 15 January 1941, Alfonso XIII renounced his rights to the defunct Spanish throne in favour of Juan. He died of a heart attack in Rome on 28 February that year.

In Spain, dictator Francisco Franco ordered three days of national mourning. The ex-king's funeral was held in Rome in the Church of Santa Maria degli Angeli e dei Martiri. He was buried in the Church of Santa Maria in Monserrato degli Spagnoli, the Spanish national church in Rome, immediately below the tombs of Popes Callixtus III and Alexander VI. In January 1980 his remains were transferred to El Escorial in Spain.

Legacy

Alfonso was a promoter of tourism in Spain. The need for the lodging of his wedding guests prompted the construction of the luxurious Hotel Palace in Madrid. He also supported the creation of a network of state-run lodges, Paradores, in historic buildings of Spain. His fondness for the sport of football led to the patronage of several "royal" ("real" in Spanish) football clubs, the first being Real Club Deportivo de La Coruña in 1907. Selected others include Real Madrid, Real Sociedad, Real Betis, Real Unión, Espanyol, Real Zaragoza and Real Racing Club.

An avenue in the northern Madrid neighbourhood of Chamartín, Avenida de Alfonso XIII, is named after him. A street in Merthyr Tydfil, in Wales, was built especially to house Spanish immigrants in the mining industry and named Alphonso Street after Alfonso XIII.

Ratoncito Pérez first appeared as the Spanish equivalent to the Tooth Fairy in a 1894 tale written by Luis Coloma for King Alfonso XIII, who had just lost a milk tooth at the age of eight, with the King appearing in the tale as "King Buby". The tale has been adapted into further literary works and movies since then, with the character of King Buby appearing in some. The tradition of Ratoncito Pérez replacing the lost milk teeth with a small payment or gift while the child sleeps is almost universally followed today in Spain and Hispanic America.

Personal life

Legitimate and illegitimate children

Alfonso and his wife Princess Victoria Eugenie of Battenberg (Ena) had seven children:
Alfonso, Prince of Asturias (1907–1938);
Infante Jaime, Duke of Segovia (1908–1975);
Infanta Beatriz (1909–2002);
Infante Fernando (stillborn 1910);
Infanta María Cristina (1911–1996);
Infante Juan, Count of Barcelona (1913–1993);
Infante Gonzalo (1914–1934).

Attitude towards Jews
Alfonso was known for his friendly attitude towards Jews and publicly praised them. He took several actions to offer them protection. In 1917, Alfonso instructed the Spanish consul in Jerusalem, Antonio de la Cierva y Lewita, Count of Ballobar, to help protect Palestinian Jews. On another occasion, after a high official in Tetuan had committed onslaughts against Jews, a delegation composed of Catholics, Jews, and Muslims appealed to Alfonso. The King then removed the Tetuan official from power, in spite of the fact that the official possessed the support of the Spanish Minister of Foreign Affairs. According to the Jewish Professor Abraham S.E. Yahuda, Alfonso told Yahuda in private conversations that he would issue no policies of discrimination towards Jews, believing all of his Spanish subjects to be entitled to equal rights and protection.

Pornographic cinema
Alfonso is occasionally referred to as "the playboy king", due in part to his promotion and collection of Spanish pornographic films, as well as his extramarital affairs. As King, Alfonso commissioned pornographic films through the Barcelona production company Royal Films, with the Count of Romanones acting as an intermediary figure between him and the company. Between forty to seventy pornographic films are said to have been shot in total (three of which have been preserved) and were screened in Barcelona's Chinatown, as well as during Alfonso's private screenings. The films, while silent and in black and white, were nonetheless very explicit for the time, showing full nudity and sex scenes. These films featured content considered immoral and degenerate, including sexual relationships involving Catholic priests, lesbianism, and "women with enormous breasts" (the last of which is said to have been Alfonso's passion). Most of these films were later destroyed during Franco's regime.

This has led some to speculate that Alfonso may have possessed a sex addiction.

Heraldry

Honours

Spanish honours
1,072nd Knight of the Golden Fleece, 1886
Grand Cross of the Order of Charles III, with Collar, 1886
Grand Cross of the Order of Isabella the Catholic, with Collar, 1927
Order of Santiago
Order of Calatrava
Order of Alcántara
Order of Montesa
Maestranza de caballería (Royal Cavalry Armory) of Ronda, Sevilla, Granada, Valencia and Zaragoza
Founder of the Civil Order of Alfonso XII, 23 May 1902
Founder of the Order of Civil Merit, 25 June 1926

Foreign honours

In the Royal Library of Madrid, there are books containing emblems of the Spanish monarch.

Ancestry
Alfonso XIII is a rare example of endogamy. In the eleventh generation he has only 111 ancestors whereas in a standard situation one expects to identify 1024 of them. Here we are with a situation of implex of 89%.

See also
1902 Copa de la Coronación
List of covers of Time magazine (1920s), (1930s)

Notes

References

Bibliography

Churchill, Sir Winston. Great Contemporaries. London: T. Butterworth, 1937. Contains the most famous single account of Alfonso in the English language. The author, writing shortly after the Spanish Civil War began, retained considerable fondness for the ex-sovereign.
Collier, William Miller. At the Court of His Catholic Majesty. Chicago: McClurg, 1912. The author was American ambassador to Spain from 1905 to 1909.
Noel, Gerard. Ena: Spain's English Queen. London: Constable, 1984. Considerably more candid than Petrie about Alfonso, the private man, and about the miseries the royal family experienced because of their haemophiliac children.

Petrie, Sir Charles. King Alfonso XIII and His Age. London: Chapman & Hall, 1963. Written as it was during Queen Ena's lifetime, this book necessarily omits the King's extramarital affairs; but it remains a useful biography, not least because the author knew Alfonso quite well, interviewed him at considerable length, and relates him to the wider Spanish intellectual culture of his time.
Pilapil, Vicente R. Alfonso XIII. Twayne's rulers and statesmen of the world series 12. New York: Twayne, 1969.
Sencourt, Robert. King Alfonso: A Biography. London: Faber, 1942.

External links

Historiaantiqua. Alfonso XIII;  (2008)
Visit by Alphonso XIII to Deauville in 1922 (with images)

 
1886 births
1941 deaths
19th-century Spanish monarchs
20th-century Spanish monarchs
Nobility from Madrid
House of Bourbon (Spain)
Restoration (Spain)
Legitimist pretenders to the French throne
British field marshals
Modern child monarchs
Spanish infantes
Burials in the Pantheon of Kings at El Escorial
Spanish captain generals
Captain generals of the Navy
Grand Masters of the Order of the Golden Fleece
Knights of the Golden Fleece of Spain
Grand Masters of the Order of Isabella the Catholic
Recipients of the Order of Isabella the Catholic
Collars of the Order of Isabella the Catholic
Knights Grand Cross of the Order of Isabella the Catholic
Laureate Cross of Saint Ferdinand
Crosses of Military Merit
Grand Crosses of Military Merit
Crosses of Naval Merit
Grand Crosses of Naval Merit
Crosses of Aeronautical Merit
Grand Masters of the Royal and Military Order of San Hermenegild
Recipients of the Royal and Military Order of Saint Hermenegild
Grand Crosses of the Royal and Military Order of San Hermenegild
Grand Masters of the Order of Calatrava
Knights of Calatrava
Grand Masters of the Order of Santiago
Knights of Santiago
Grand Masters of the Order of Alcántara
Knights of the Order of Alcántara
Grand Masters of the Order of Montesa
Knights of the Order of Montesa
Grand Crosses of the Order of Saint Stephen of Hungary
Collars of the Order of the White Lion
Extra Knights Companion of the Garter
Honorary Knights Grand Cross of the Royal Victorian Order
Bailiffs Grand Cross of Honour and Devotion of the Sovereign Military Order of Malta
Monarchs who abdicated
Dethroned monarchs
Navarrese titular monarchs
Royal reburials